Boylston Hall may refer to:

Boylston Hall (Boston), a historic meeting space formerly located in Boston, Massachusetts
Boylston Hall (Harvard University), a building at Harvard University